Monstera filamentosa is a flowering plant in the genus Monstera and family Araceae.

It is known for its highly fenestrated leaves.

Distribution 
It is native to Costa Rica, Panama, and Colombia.

References 

filamentosa